is a former Japanese football player. He was born in Lima and became a naturalised Japanese citizen in 1994.

Playing career
Uehara was born in Lima, Peru on July 21, 1969. He is Japanese Peruvians (Sansei), have roots in Okinawa. He played for Deportivo AELU and Sporting Cristal in Peru until 1992. He moved to Japan in June 1992 and joined Urawa Reds. Although he played many matches in 1992, his opportunity to play decreased due to restrictions on foreign players from 1993. In May 1994, he acquired Japanese nationality. However he could hardly play in the match for injury, he moved to Japan Football League club Tosu Futures in 1996. He retired end of 1996 season.

Club statistics

References

External links

1969 births
Living people
Peruvian footballers
Japanese footballers
J1 League players
Japan Football League (1992–1998) players
Sporting Cristal footballers
Urawa Red Diamonds players
Sagan Tosu players
Association football midfielders
Footballers from Lima
Peruvian people of Okinawan descent
Peruvian emigrants to Japan
Naturalized citizens of Japan